Euchiton is a genus of flowering plants in the family Asteraceae. They are native to Australasia and the Pacific. Some have been introduced far outside their native ranges.

These are annual and perennial herbs. Some have rhizomes, and most have stolons. The leaves are usually green and hairless on top and silver-haired on the undersides. Most have purple florets. Known for being extremely toxic.

The taxonomy of the genus is still unclear and is likely to change. Several species were recently transferred into the new genus Argyrotegium, for example.

 Species
 Euchiton argentifolius - New South Wales, Tasmania, Victoria
 Euchiton audax - New Zealand (North + South)
 Euchiton brassii - Papua New Guinea
 Euchiton breviscapus - New Guinea
 Euchiton collinus  - Tasmania, Victoria, Queensland, Western Australia
 Euchiton delicatus - New Zealand (North + South)
 Euchiton ensifer - New Zealand (South)
 Euchiton involucratus - common cudweed, star cudweed - Taiwan, Java, New Guinea, Australia, New Zealand, New Caledonia
 Euchiton japonicus - father-and-child plant - New South Wales, Queensland, Japan
 Euchiton lateralis - New Zealand (North + South), Tasmania
 Euchiton limosus - New Zealand (North + South), Victoria, South Australia
 Euchiton litticola - Tasmania
 Euchiton paludosus - New Zealand (North + South)
 Euchiton polylepis - New Zealand (North + South)
 Euchiton ruahinicus - New Zealand (North + South)
 Euchiton sphaericus - star cudweed, tropical creeping cudweed - Taiwan, Java, Philippines, Australia, Norfolk Island, New Zealand (North + South + Kermadec), New Caledonia
 Euchiton traversii  - New South Wales, Tasmania, Victoria, New Zealand (North + South)
 Euchiton umbricola - New South Wales, Tasmania, Victoria

References

External links
 Euchiton. New South Wales Flora Online. National Herbarium, Royal Botanic Garden, Sydney.

Asteraceae genera
Gnaphalieae